Bark is the outermost layers of stems and roots of woody plants.  Plants with bark include trees, woody vines, and shrubs. Bark refers to all the tissues outside the vascular cambium and is a nontechnical term. It overlays the wood and consists of the inner bark and the outer bark. The inner bark, which in older stems is living tissue, includes the innermost layer of the periderm. The outer bark on older stems includes the dead tissue on the surface of the stems, along with parts of the outermost periderm and all the tissues on the outer side of the periderm. The outer bark on trees which lies external to the living periderm is also called the rhytidome. 

Products derived from bark include bark shingle siding and wall coverings, spices and other flavorings, tanbark for tannin, resin, latex, medicines, poisons, various hallucinogenic chemicals and cork. Bark has been used to make cloth, canoes, and ropes and used as a surface for paintings and map making. A number of plants are also grown for their attractive or interesting bark colorations and surface textures or their bark is used as landscape mulch.

The process of removing bark is decortication and a log or trunk from which bark has been removed is said to be decorticated.

Botanical description

Bark is present only on woody plants - herbaceous plants and stems of young plants lack bark.

From the outside to the inside of a mature woody stem, the layers include the following:

 Bark
 Periderm
 Cork (phellem or suber), includes the rhytidome
 Cork cambium (phellogen)
 Phelloderm
 Cortex
 Phloem
 Vascular cambium
 Wood (xylem)
 Sapwood (alburnum)
 Heartwood (duramen)
 Pith (medulla)

In young stems, which lack what is commonly called bark, the tissues are, from the outside to the inside:

 Epidermis, which may be replaced by periderm
 Cortex
 Primary and secondary phloem
 Vascular cambium
 Secondary and primary xylem.

Cork cell walls contain suberin, a waxy substance which protects the stem against water loss, the invasion of insects into the stem, and prevents infections by bacteria and fungal spores. The cambium tissues, i.e., the cork cambium and the vascular cambium, are the only parts of a woody stem where cell division occurs; undifferentiated cells in the vascular cambium divide rapidly to produce secondary xylem to the inside and secondary phloem to the outside. Phloem is a nutrient-conducting tissue composed of sieve tubes or sieve cells mixed with parenchyma and fibers. The cortex is the primary tissue of stems and roots. In stems the cortex is between the epidermis layer and the phloem, in roots the inner layer is not phloem but the pericycle.

As the stem ages and grows, changes occur that transform the surface of the stem into the bark. The epidermis is a layer of cells that cover the plant body, including the stems, leaves, flowers and fruits, that protects the plant from the outside world.  In old stems the epidermal layer, cortex, and primary phloem become separated from the inner tissues by thicker formations of cork.  Due to the thickening cork layer these cells die because they do not receive water and nutrients.  This dead layer is the rough corky bark that forms around tree trunks and other stems.

Cork, sometimes confused with bark in colloquial speech, is the outermost layer of a woody stem, derived from the cork cambium. It serves as protection against damage from parasites, herbivorous animals and diseases, as well as dehydration and fire.

Periderm

Often a secondary covering called the periderm forms on small woody stems and many non-woody plants, which is composed of cork (phellem), the cork cambium (phellogen), and the phelloderm. The periderm forms from the phellogen which serves as a lateral meristem. The periderm replaces the epidermis, and acts as a protective covering like the epidermis. Mature phellem cells have suberin in their walls to protect the stem from desiccation and pathogen attack. Older phellem cells are dead, as is the case with woody stems. The skin on the potato tuber (which is an underground stem) constitutes the cork of the periderm.

In woody plants, the epidermis of newly grown stems is replaced by the periderm later in the year. As the stems grow a layer of cells form under the epidermis, called the cork cambium, these cells produce cork cells that turn into cork. A limited number of cell layers may form interior to the cork cambium, called the phelloderm.
As the stem grows, the cork cambium produces new layers of cork which are impermeable to gases and water and the cells outside the periderm, namely the epidermis, cortex and older secondary phloem die.

Within the periderm are lenticels, which form during the production of the first periderm layer.  Since there are living cells within the cambium layers that need to exchange gases during metabolism, these lenticels, because they have numerous intercellular spaces, allow gaseous exchange with the outside atmosphere. As the bark develops, new lenticels are formed within the cracks of the cork layers.

Rhytidome
The rhytidome is the most familiar part of bark, being the outer layer that covers the trunks of trees. It is composed mostly of dead cells and is produced by the formation of multiple layers of suberized periderm, cortical and phloem tissue. The rhytidome is especially well developed in older stems and roots of trees. In shrubs, older bark is quickly exfoliated and thick rhytidome accumulates. It is generally thickest and most distinctive at the trunk or bole (the area from the ground to where the main branching starts) of the tree.

Chemical composition
Bark tissues make up by weight between 10 and 20% of woody vascular plants and consists of various biopolymers, tannins, lignin, suberin and polysaccharides. Up to 40% of the bark tissue is made of lignin, which forms an important part of a plant, providing structural support by crosslinking between different polysaccharides, such as cellulose.

Condensed tannin, which is in fairly high concentration in bark tissue, is thought to inhibit decomposition. It could be due to this factor that the degradation of lignin is far less pronounced in bark tissue than it is in wood. 
It has been proposed that, in the cork layer (the phellogen), suberin acts as a barrier to microbial degradation and so protects the internal structure of the plant.

Analysis of the lignin in bark wall during decay by the white-rot fungi Lentinula edodes (Shiitake mushroom) using 13C NMR revealed that the lignin polymers contained more Guaiacyl lignin units than Syringyl units compared to the interior of the plant. Guaiacyl units are less susceptible to degradation as, compared to syringyl, they contain fewer aryl-aryl bonds, can form a condensed lignin structure and have a lower redox potential. This could mean that the concentration and type of lignin units could provide additional resistance to fungal decay for plants protected by bark.

Damage and repair
Bark can sustain damage from environmental factors, such as frost crack and sun scald, as well as biological factors, such as woodpecker and boring beetle attack.  Male deer and other male members of the Cervidae cause extensive bark damage during the rutting season by rubbing their antlers against the tree to remove their velvet.

Bark is often damaged by being bound to stakes or wrapped with wires. In the past, this damage was called bark-galling, and was treated by applying clay laid on the galled place and binding up with hay.  In modern usage, "galling" most typically refers to a type of abnormal growth on a plant caused by insects or pathogens.

Bark damage can have a number of detrimental effects on the plant.  Bark serves as a physical barrier to disease pressure, especially from fungi, so its removal makes the plant more susceptible to disease.  Damage or destruction of the phloem impedes the transport of photosynthetic products throughout the plant; in extreme cases, when a band of phloem all the way around the stem is removed, the plant will usually quickly die.  Bark damage in horticultural applications, as in gardening and public landscaping, results in often unwanted aesthetic damage.

The degree to which woody plants are able to repair gross physical damage to their bark is quite variable across species and type of damage. Some are able to produce a callus growth which heals over the wound rapidly, but leaves a clear scar, whilst others such as oaks do not produce an extensive callus repair.  Sap is sometimes produced to seal the damaged area against disease and insect intrusion.

A number of living organisms live in or on bark, including insects, fungi and other plants like mosses, algae and other vascular plants. Many of these organisms are pathogens or parasites but some also have symbiotic relationships.

Uses
The inner bark (phloem) of some trees is edible.  In hunter-gatherer societies and in times of famine, it is harvested and used as a food source.  In Scandinavia, bark bread is made from rye to which the toasted and ground innermost layer of bark of scots pine or birch is added. The Sami people of far northern Europe use large sheets of Pinus sylvestris bark that are removed in the spring, prepared and stored for use as a staple food resource.  The inner bark is eaten fresh, dried or roasted.

Bark can be used as a construction material, and was used widel in pre-industrial societies.  Some barks, particularly Birch bark, can be removed in long sheets and other mechanically cohesive structures, allowing the bark to be used in the construction of canoes, as the drainage layer in roofs, for shoes, backpacks, and other useful items.

In the cork oak (Quercus suber) the bark is thick enough to be harvested as a cork product without killing the tree; in this species the bark may get very thick (e.g. more than 20 cm has been reported). 

Some s have significantly different phytochemical content from other parts. Some of these phytochemicals have pesticidal, culinary, or medicinally and culturally important ethnopharmacological properties.

Bark contains strong fibres known as bast, and there is a long tradition in northern Europe of using bark from coppiced young branches of the small-leaved lime (Tilia cordata) to produce cordage and rope, used for example in the rigging of Viking Age longships.

Among the commercial products made from bark are cork, cinnamon, quinine (from the bark of Cinchona) and aspirin (from the bark of willow trees). The bark of some trees, notably oak (Quercus robur) is a source of tannic acid, which is used in tanning. Bark chips generated as a by-product of lumber production are often used in bark mulch.  Bark is important to the horticultural industry since in shredded form it is used for plants that do not thrive in ordinary soil, such as epiphytes.

Wood bark contains lignin which when pyrolyzed yields a liquid bio-oil product rich in natural phenol derivatives. These are used as a replacement for fossil-based phenols in phenol-formaldehyde (PF) resins used in Oriented Strand Board (OSB) and plywood.

Gallery

See also

 Bark beetle
 Bark painting
 Trunk (botany)
 Bark isolate
 Bark-binding, a diseased condition of tree bark

References

Other references
Cédric Pollet, Bark: An Intimate Look at the World's Trees. London, Frances Lincoln, 2010. (Translated by Susan Berry) 

Plant physiology
Plant morphology